Serge Testa is an Australian yachtsman who holds the world record for the circumnavigation in the smallest boat, completing the voyage in 1987. His  boat, the Acrohc Australis, was designed so that all controls could be operated from inside enabling him to close the hatch in foul weather. The boat is currently on display at the Queensland Maritime Museum in South Bank.

Publications
 Testa, Serge. 500 Days: Around the World on a 12 Foot Yacht. Trident Press, 1988. .

References

External links
 Serge Testa's web site

1950 births
Single-handed circumnavigating sailors
Australian sailors
Maritime writers
Living people